Chorokbaem Media is a Korean drama and animation production company.

List of works

References

External links
  

Mass media companies established in 2000
Television production companies of South Korea
Companies based in Seoul
Companies listed on KOSDAQ
South Korean companies established in 2000